Aldershot School is a grade 7–12 school located in Burlington, Ontario. Although the current school building was constructed in 1959-1960, the original Aldershot School was built in 1870, making the name the oldest in continual use for an educational institution in Halton region.

Originally a high school (grades 9-13, later cut back to grade 12), grades 7 and 8 were added in 2001 to make use of spare capacity. The school's enrollment is 464 students as of 2017.

The school's Latin motto, Veritas Nos Ducat (meaning "Truth Shall Lead Us"), speaks to a remarkable honour system in place during the 1970s.  At that time, any misplaced belonging in the school was essentially guaranteed to make its way to its rightful owner, and in some cases, take-home exams were permitted, bearing that the student not use outside information and write the school motto on his or her test. The remnant of this implicit system is in the school's also traditional, annual Honour Society listing, which notices students who have achieved distinctions in academics at a level of above 80% in every course taken.

Rankings 
Scores based on EQAO scores and literacy tests place Aldershot far and above other schools in Halton, having been ranked first for performance by the Halton District School Board's (HDSB) annual reviews.  It was the top rated school in Halton according to the Toronto Sun (2007), and the 13th best school in the Greater Toronto Area.  From 2003 onward, the school's rankings have fluctuated within the top 50 schools in the province, arriving at the 2007 rank of No. 16, and 2008 rank of No. 12 school in Ontario, according to the Fraser Institute.

School events 

Annual events run by the school's Student Leadership Team include Terry Fox Run (September), Relay For Life (May), Spring Carnival (May), and Beach Day (March). Other regular events include pep rallies.

In recent years, fewer events have been organized by the student council (formerly the SLT) as student interest has declined.

There are also many "school spirit" days throughout the year, during which students may partake in an activity to show their school spirit (e.g. Jersey Day, Ugly Sweater Day, "Fancy" Day).

The school's administration has not organized the annual senior prom since 2010, however, since then, the graduating class has taken it upon themselves to organize the event.

Athletics 

Female sports teams at the school are often called the Aldershot "Lady Lions".  Hockey and baseball teams are referred to as the "Aces". All other teams are referred to as the Lions.

The school's performance in athletics has been marked by numerous regional wins, despite being one of the smallest schools in Halton (in Halton D3 football, Aldershot is half the size of the next smallest school, Lester B. Pearson) such as senior boys' volleyball OFSAA (Ontario Federation of School Athletic Associations) favorites in 2006 and 2007.

Music 

The school has a Senior Concert Band (grades 9-12), Junior Concert Band (grades 7-9), Choir (grades 7-12), Jazz Band, and occasionally a String Ensemble.  The groups all play at an annual Music Night and sometimes at other events or festivals.

Aldershot has regularly participated in music competitions in regional and provincial competitions like MusicFest Canada and the OBA Concert Band Festival with both the Junior and Senior bands achieving gold, silver and bronze medals several times.

.

Other accomplishments 
Aldershot is home to the ECO Studies program - a Specialist High Skills Major program in conjunction with the Royal Botanical Gardens, Ontario, which allows students to earn a specialized diploma. The ECO Studies program also runs an environmental leadership program for elementary students called "ECO Rangers", which has received exceptionally positive reviews from the elementary schools who have participated. 

Aldershot is known for having a very strong Link Crew program whose mission is stated as "creating positive change by building positive relationships". Aldershot is also noted for having a creative breakfast program for students, and a range of  extracurricular options on par with schools of over 2000 students.

Miscellaneous 
The Aldershot School mascot is a stylized golden lion, most often represented clawing upward to a stylized medieval crown.  A traditional symbol/marking at the school is a simplified pawprint (consisting of four circular shapes).

The first Student Trustee to come from Aldershot was elected to the HDSB as 2007-2008 Student Trustee Jason Karmody.

In 2019, Aldershot began an I-STEM program in order to attract more students to the school.

Notable alumni 
 Melanie Booth, Canadian Women's Soccer Team player
 Josh Bradford, guitarist for the band Silverstein 
 Kyle Burns, director, writer 
 Jim Carrey, actor
 Gordon Deppe, guitarist for the band Spoons 
 Rob MacIsaac, President of Hamilton Health Sciences
 Chris Schultz, football player
 Brett Wickens, Creative Director and founding member of the band Spoons; founder of Ceramic Hello

See also 
 List of high schools in Ontario
 Halton District School Board
 Aldershot, Ontario

External links 
 
 HDSB homepage

References 

High schools in Burlington, Ontario
1962 establishments in Ontario
Educational institutions established in 1962